Óscar Castellano Zamora (born 7 October 1997), commonly known as Chiqui, is a Spanish professional footballer who plays as a winger for Marino de Luanco, on loan from CD Lugo.

Club career
Born in Mérida, Badajoz, Extremadura, Chiqui moved to Salceda de Caselas, Pontevedra, Galicia at the age of 13 and finished his formation with UD Santa Mariña. After making his first team debut during the 2015–16 season, in the regional leagues, he subsequently represented Erizana CF.

Ahead of the 2017–18 campaign, Chiqui signed for Tercera División side CD Choco. On 21 June 2018, he moved to fellow league team Arosa SC, being a regular starter before joining CD Lugo on 18 July of the following year, being initially assigned to the farm team also in division four.

Chiqui made his professional debut on 8 December 2019, coming on as a late substitute for Tete Morente in a 1–3 away loss against Girona FC in the Segunda División championship. The following 17 September, he moved to Segunda División B side Marino de Luanco on loan for the 2020–21 season.

References

External links
 
 
 

1997 births
Living people
People from Mérida, Spain
Sportspeople from the Province of Badajoz
Spanish footballers
Footballers from Extremadura
Association football wingers
Segunda División players
Segunda División B players
Tercera División players
Divisiones Regionales de Fútbol players
Polvorín FC players
CD Lugo players
Marino de Luanco footballers